Gunner Bay is a large bay in the far north of Bermuda. It contains the entrance to St. George's Harbor and Paget Island, and is overlooked by St. David's Head in the far north of St. David's Island.

References

Bays of Bermuda
St. George's Parish, Bermuda